Piyush Sahdev (born 12 March 1982) is an Indian television actor. He has appeared in several TV daily soaps but is known for his roles of Rama in Devon Ke Dev...Mahadev, Abhigyan in supercops vs supervillains, Kabir Tripathi in Sapne Suhane Ladakpan Ke, Pawan Bakshi in Devanshi and Samay in Beyhadh. He is the brother of popular actors, Meher Vij and Gireesh Sahdev.

Early life
Sahdev was born on 12 March 1982 and hails from Delhi, India. Piyush has a younger sister Vaishali aka Meher Vij. His brother Gireesh Sahdev is also an actor.

Personal life and career

Early days (2004–12)
Before making his official debut in Indian television, Sahdev did an episodic role in 2004 for Special Squad, a crime thriller on Star One. After three years he was selected to play a supporting role from 2007 to 2009 in Ghar Ek Sapnaa on Sahara One as Sharad Chatterjee, the brother of the female lead. Also he appeared as Varun Ranawat in the Zee TV series Har Ghar Kuch Kehta Hai from 2007 to 2008.

Sahdev's first leading role as Kulwant Singh, an army officer came in 2008 came with Meet Mila De Rabba on Sony TV opposite Surilie Gautam. It went off air in 2009. He next did a cameo appearance for Gul Khan's first production Geet in 2010 as Arjun Singh Rathore. From 2011-2012 he portrayed his first negative character of Aman Mathur in the popular hit show Mann Kee Awaaz Pratigya on Star Plus.

Marriage and huge popularity (2012–17)
In 2012, Sahdev signed Hum Ne Li Hai... Shapath, a crime detective series on Life OK in which he played the role of Senior Inspector Abhigyan Mitra.

That year on 25 June, he married actress and friend Akangsha Rawat.

He quit Hum Ne Li Hai... Shapath in 2013. Later that year Sahdev rise to prominence with his portrayal of Lord Rama opposite Rubina Dilaik in the highly acclaimed mythological drama Devon Ke Dev...Mahadev on Life OK, which marked a turning point in his career, making it his breakthrough performance. In an interview, he had already stated that he always wished to once play Rama in his career, which he eventually fulfilled and also won immense recognition for the same. He also played the lead role of Kabir in Zee TV's Sapne Suhane Ladakpan Ke.

Divorce, controversy and further work (2017–present)
In mid-2017, Sahdev and his wife Akangsha Rawat were separated. On 24 November 2017, Sahdev was arrested after a woman lodged an FIR at the Versova Police Station, Mumbai accusing him of rape.

In December 2017, Sahdev entered Sony TV's Beyhadh as Samay, a negative role which garnered him much appreciation. In the same year, Sahdev joined Colors TV's Devanshi. In 2018, he played the role of Siraj in Zee TV's Ishq Subhan Allah. He also portrayed the role of Abu Fazl in Colors TV's Dastaan-E-Mohabbat: Salim Anarkali.

In September 2021, he is appearing as Inspector Piyush in &TV's Mauka-E-Vardaat. Since April 2022, he enter as negative role in Sony TV's show Bade Achhe Lagte Hain 2 played the role of Krish Dixit.

Filmography

Television

Music videos

References

External links
 

1982 births
Living people
Male actors from Delhi
Indian male television actors
Indian male soap opera actors
21st-century Indian male actors